My Way or the Highway is the first major studio album released by blues guitarist Guitar Shorty (David Kearney), even though he had been in the business since the 1950s. The album is credited to "Guitar Shorty & The Otis Grand Blues Band"; it was at the behest and producing of Grand that Shorty made the record.

It was first released in 1991 on CD by the label JSP and was subsequently re-released in 1999 and 2005. Also, the tracks "Red Hot Mama" and "No Educated Woman" would later appear on Shorty's compilation album, "The Best of Guitar Shorty", in 2006.

Track listing 
"No Educated Woman" (Kearney) — 6:03
"You Gave Me the Blues Baby" (Kearney) — 5:46
"Shorty Jumps In" (Grand, Kearney) — 6:14
"Down Through the Years" (Kearney) — 5:32
"Red Hot Mama" (Kearney) — 3:23
"Hot and Saucy, Short and Grand" (Grand, Kearney) — 6:39
"It's Too Late" (Kearney) — 11:30
"Kick Out" (Grand, Kearney) — 6:41
"My Way or the Highway" (Kearney) — 5:57

Personnel 
Band:
Tony Ashton — organ (Hammond)
Peter Beck — saxophone (alto, tenor)
Buzz Brown — harmonica
Otis Grand — guitar, producer
Guitar Shorty — guitar, vocals
Mike Hobart — saxophone (baritone)
Dan Quinton — bass
Daniel Strittmatter — drums

Production:
Martin Atkinson — mixing
Norman Darwen, John Stedman — liner notes

Reception 

Allmusic proclaims that the "acrobatic guitarist informed everyone he was alive and lively with this one." Shorty's playing is greatly enhanced by Grand; The Penguin Guide to Blues Recordings comments that they both perform well due to the "diversity of the material."

References 

1991 albums
Guitar Shorty albums